"La Revolución Evolution" (La Evolución in Latin American edition) is the name of the re-release album of La Revolución, released on November 23, 2009. This album include all songs of La Revolución except the track "Descará". However, it includes five new tracks and remixes as well as an extra DVD that includes behind-the-scenes footage of Wisin & Yandel’s worldwide tour and the music videos for "Gracias a Tí" (including the version with Enrique Iglesias), "Imagínate" and "Abusadora". The album earned the Lo Nuestro Award for Urban Album of the Year.

Track listing
CD 1
 La Revolución
 Quítame el Dolor
 Encendio
 Mujeres in the Club (featuring 50 Cent)
 Ahí Voy
 Emociones
 Gracias a Ti
 Perfecto (featuring Yaviah & Ivy Queen)
 Abusadora
 Ella Me Llama
 Yo Lo Sé
 Como Quieres Que Te Olvide (featuring Ednita Nazario)
 Vives en Mí
 Besos Mojados
 Descara (featuring Yomo)

CD 2
 Sandungueo (featuring Franco “El Gorila", Yomo & Gadiel)
 Te Siento
 Imagínate (featuring T-Pain)
 All Up To You (featuring Aventura y Akon)
 Pasan Los Días
 Desaparecio (featuring Tico & Gadiel)
 Ella Me Llama (Remix) (featuring Akon)
 Gracias A Ti (Remix) (featuring Enrique Iglesias)

References

Wisin & Yandel albums
2009 albums
Albums produced by Luny Tunes